Kokoona is a genus of plants in the family Celastraceae.

Species include:

 
Celastrales genera
Taxonomy articles created by Polbot